LA Ice Cola is an Australian soft drink owned by Tru Blu Beverages. It is similar to Coca-Cola and Pepsi, which are its competitors. It was launched in Australia in 2000. The drink is mainly a supermarket brand, but is now distributing into the route channel, including independent service stations. The "LA" in the brand name has no meaning, and was selected because the marketing department decided the name would roll off the tongue.  LA Ice has a distinct caramel flavour and for this reason, it has been voted ‘best tasting cola’ amongst independent cola surveys.

The recently campaigned slogan reads: "Nothing’s Cooler than Ice!".

History
There are currently 3 main types of available flavours; LA Ice (Original flavour), LA Maxi Ice (Sugar free with enhanced flavour), LA Ice No Sugar Cola (Sugar free without enhanced flavour).

There were many flavours that are now unavailable, these include; LA Diet Ice Cola (Diet variety), LA Coffee Ice Cola, also known as LA Ice Café Cola (Coffee flavour).

The main reason for the drink's popularity is that it is cheaper than most of its rivals, costing as little as $1 for 2 litres. LA Ice Cola is also the first cola brand in Australia to introduce a Coffee Variety. LA Ice Café Cola is comparable to Pepsi Tarik in flavour.

LA Maxi Ice has a stronger flavour than Pepsi Max or Diet Coke, which some people may find polarising.

References

Products introduced in 1999
Australian drinks
Cola brands